Ellen Steiber is an American novelist and author of books for young readers, including some based on single episodes of The X-Files and Full House series.

Background 

Steiber was raised in Newark and West Orange, New Jersey. She went to Carnegie Mellon University in Pittsburgh, Pennsylvania. When she finished college at Carnegie, Steiber moved to New York City where she worked for a Japanese trading company. She worked there for a couple years and eventually became a children's book writer.

Through the 1980s, Steiber lived in New York City. During this time period, she studied karate and had a wide social circle of artists and writers. Then in 1991, her lifelong dream of moving to the southwest was finally fulfilled. Ellen now lives in Tucson, Arizona with Doug, her partner.

Steiber's interests include: folk music, folklore, Mexican culture and border arts, classic children book illustrations, poetry, and many different types of fiction books.

References

External links 

  
Bibliography with gallery at FantasticFiction.co.uk
 
 
 Ellen Steiber at ''The Encyclopedia of Science Fiction

20th-century American novelists
American women novelists
American children's writers
Carnegie Mellon University alumni
Year of birth missing (living people)
Living people
American women children's writers
20th-century American women writers